Dennis Howard Wright  (11 August 1931 – 8 April 2020) was a British medical doctor and professor of pathology with an international reputation in haematopathology.

Biography
Wright grew up in the county of Norfolk and attended the City of Norwich School with a Norfolk county scholarship. He graduated from the University of Bristol in 1953 with a B.Sc. in physiology and in 1956 with  an MB ChB (Hons). After receiving his degree, he fulfilled his national service requirement by serving as a pathologist in Kampala, Uganda. There he worked as a lecturer, senior lecturer, and then reader in pathology at Makerere University's medical school, where he spent eight years. During the late 1950s and early 1960s, he worked with Dr. Denis Burkitt in describing the pathology of Burkitt lymphoma. Wright became a leading expert on lymphomas. In 1964 he graduated from the University of Bristol with a higher doctorate MD. His M.D. thesis is entitled Malignant Lymphomas in Uganda. In 1965 he qualified as MRCPath. In 1968 he returned from Uganda to England to become a reader in pathology at Birmingham University. In 1972 he was appointed the Foundation Professor of Pathology at the University of Southampton and retired there in 1996 as professor emeritus.

In the 1970s, Wright pioneered the use of immunofluorescence to investigate the cellular pathogenesis of Hodgkin lymphoma. He was the first to suggest that Reed–Sternberg cells are derived from B-cells — a controversial proposal that was not confirmed  until several decades later. In the 1980s and 1990s, he and his coworkers were among the first to describe T-cell lymphomas associated with enteropathy and to describe lymphomas of mucosa-associated lymphoid tissue. His pioneering research transformed lymphoma diagnose by the use of immunoperoxidase staining of paraffin sections. Later, he and his coworkers published a number of papers involving molecular analysis of lymphomas.

As a professor, Wright was committed not only to his research but also to general surgical and autopsy pathology. From 1983 to 1994 he was the editor-in-chief of The Journal of Pathology from 1983 to 1994. He was also served on the editorial board of Biomedicine. He served as the president of the European Haematopathology Society.

He received in 1973 the Paul Ehrlich and Ludwig Darmstaedter Prize for his research on the pathology of Burkitt lymphoma. He was elected in 1977 a Fellow of the Royal College of Pathologists (FRCPath). His final publication, which was the 3rd edition of Diagnostic Lymph Node Pathology (2016), received the accolade of ‘Highly Commended’ in the British Medical Association's 2017 book awards.

Upon his death, Dennis H. Wright was survived by his widow, Elizabeth, and their two children, as well as six children from his first marriage, and ten grandchildren. Three of his eight children became medical doctors.

Selected publications

Articles

Books

References

1931 births
2020 deaths
British pathologists
English pathologists
20th-century English medical doctors
21st-century English medical doctors
People educated at the City of Norwich School
Alumni of the University of Bristol
People associated with Makerere University
Academics of the University of Southampton
Fellows of the Royal College of Pathologists